Unified is the second studio album by Finnish trance duo Super8 & Tab, and was released on 27 October 2014 through label Anjunabeats.

Track listing
Standard edition

Extended mix edition

References

2014 albums
Super8 & Tab albums
Anjunabeats albums